The chestnut-winged foliage-gleaner (Dendroma erythroptera) is a species of bird in the family Furnariidae. It is found in Bolivia, Brazil, Colombia, Ecuador, Peru, and Venezuela. Its natural habitat is subtropical or tropical moist lowland forest.

References

Further reading

chestnut-winged foliage-gleaner
Birds of the Amazon Basin
Birds of the Ecuadorian Amazon
Birds of the Peruvian Amazon
chestnut-winged foliage-gleaner
chestnut-winged foliage-gleaner
Taxonomy articles created by Polbot
Taxobox binomials not recognized by IUCN